The Branch River is a river in the U.S. state of Rhode Island. It flows for approximately 16 km (10 mi). There are six dams along the river's length, including those forming the Slatersville Reservoir. The river provided energy for many of the region's textile mills in the nineteenth century.

Course
The river is formed in Burrillville by the confluence of the Clear and Chepachet rivers. From there, it flows north to North Smithfield, past Slatersville and Forestdale to the Blackstone River.

Crossings
Below is a list of all crossings over the Branch River. The list starts at the headwaters and goes downstream.
Burrillville
Victory Highway
Broncos Highway (RI 102) (Twice)
Douglas Pike (RI 7)
North Smithfield
Main Street
Railroad Street
Rhode Island State Route 146
Great Road (RI 146A)

Tributaries
Trout and Dawley Brooks are the Branch River's only named tributaries, though it has many unnamed streams that also feed it.

See also
List of rivers in Rhode Island

References
Maps from the United States Geological Survey

Rivers of Providence County, Rhode Island
Rivers of Rhode Island
Tributaries of Providence River